The Mausoleum Murder is a fantasy novel by British writer Katherine Roberts, the fourth novel in The Seven Fabulous Wonders series and the sequel to The Amazon Temple Quest.

Plot summary 

In the beginning of the story, Alexis' home Halicarnassos is at war with Macedon. As the war rages on Alexis' stepmother still wants to make the pilgrimage to the river. Alexis has the gift to turn statues that have enough gold on them into real people. This gift gets him into trouble as his stepmother has the spirit of the old king who wants to reclaim his land. Alexis meets the princess and turns her fabled chimera to life and it rampages through the city attacking all who are known as their enemies. Alexis then goes to the river and reverses his gift and is shocked when his father and his best friend are still real when all of the other statues have turned back to stone.

2003 British novels
British fantasy novels
Novels by Katherine Roberts
Novels set in ancient Greece
Voyager Books books